Banning is an unincorporated community in Carroll County, in the U.S. state of Georgia.

History
A former variant name was "Bowenville". William Bowen was the first postmaster, and gave the community its original name. A post office called Banning was established in 1883, and remained in operation until 1942.

References

Unincorporated communities in Carroll County, Georgia
Unincorporated communities in Georgia (U.S. state)